Dinner with a Vampire is a 1989 Italian television horror film directed by Lamberto Bava and written by Dardano Sacchetti.  It was among  four films made for the Italian television series Brivido Giallo.

Plot
Four actors win an audition to be in a horror movie and travel to the director's castle for a meeting and to spend the night. Unbeknown to them, the director is actually a vampire. The vampire challenges his guests to kill him. Killing this vampire, however, is achieved only in a unique way.

Cast
George Hilton as Jurek
Riccardo Rossi as Gianni
Patrizia Pellegrino as Rita
Yvonne Sciò as Monica
Valeria Milillo as Sasha 
Isabel Russinova as Veronica, Jurek's half vampire companion
Daniele Aldrovandi as Gilles
Igor Zalewsky as Ale
Letizia Ziaco as Nadia
Stefano Sabelli as Matteo
Roberto Pedicini as a director

Production
Following the success of the film Demons and Demons 2 and other foreign horror films in Italy, the company Reiteitalia would announce in July 1986 that a series titled Brivido giallo which would be made featuring five made-for-television film directed by Lamberto Bava. Of these films only four would be made: Graveyard Disturbance, Until Death, The Ogre and Dinner with a Vampire. The films were shot between 1987 and 1988. Dinner with a Vampire was shot at Castle Sammezzano near Florence, Italy.

Italian film historian Roberto Curti described Dinner with a Vampire as being more openly a parody film compared to Bava's other films made in the series.

Release
Dinner with a Vampire aired on Italia 1 on August 29, 1989.

References

Footnotes

Sources

External links

1989 films
1989 horror films
Films directed by Lamberto Bava
Italian supernatural horror films
Films scored by Simon Boswell
Films set in castles
Italian television films
Horror television films
1980s Italian films